Humphrey Sarfaraz Peters is a Pakistani Protestant bishop. He has served as Bishop of the Diocese of Peshawar since 2011, and since 20 May 2017, Moderator and Primate in the Church of Pakistan, a United Protestant Church that holds membership in the Anglican Communion, World Methodist Council and World Communion of Reformed Churches.

He was part of the original team responsible for envisioning the Anglican Alliance, and has remained closely involved since, as a member of the steering group, and part of the team responsible for appointing the Asia facilitator. He is the former secretary of the development and relief organisation of the diocese.

He attended the Anglican Church in North America meeting of the College of Bishops, in Orlando, Florida, at 6–10 January 2014.

Peters was elected Moderator and Primate of the Church of Pakistan on 20 May 2017.

References

External links
 Church of Pakistan website 

Living people
Pakistani Anglicans
21st-century Anglican bishops in Asia
Year of birth missing (living people)
Anglican bishops of Peshawar